Lethaia is a quarterly peer-reviewed scientific journal of Earth science, covering research on palaeontology and stratigraphy. Now published by Wiley-Blackwell, it was originally published by the International Commission on Stratigraphy. It is an official publication of the International Palaeontological Association and the International Commission on Stratigraphy. The journal had a 2012 impact factor of 2.488, ranking it 7th out of 48 journals in the category "Paleontology", though its IF has since declined.

References

External links 
 

Paleontology journals
Wiley-Blackwell academic journals
English-language journals
Publications established in 1968
Quarterly journals